444 is the fifth album released by Canadian country music singer Charlie Major. It produced the singles "Right Here, Right Now", "One True Love", and "Side by Side".

Track listing

Chart performance

References

Charlie Major albums
2000 albums
Dead Reckoning Records albums